"Don't It Make You Want to Go Home" is a 1969 song by Joe South. South was also producer and arranger of the track and of its B-side, "Hearts Desire." The single was credited to "Joe South and the Believers"; the Believers included his brother Tommy South and his sister-in-law Barbara South.

"Don't It Make You Want to Go Home" became a hit on the Pop, Country, and Adult Contemporary charts of both the U.S. and Canada. It was also a Top 20 hit in Australia.

Chart history

Brook Benton cover

Brook Benton covered "Don't It Make You Want to Go Home" in 1970.  It is a track on his Homestyle LP. Benton's rendition reached #45 in the U.S. and #41 in Canada.  His version also reached number four on the U.S. Adult Contemporary chart.

The B-side, "I've Gotta Be Me," was taken from his previous album, Brook Benton Today.

Chart history

References

External links
 Lyrics of this song
 

1969 songs
1969 singles
1970 singles
Joe South songs
Bobby Bare songs
Brook Benton songs
Songs written by Joe South
Capitol Records singles
American soft rock songs
Rhythm and blues ballads
1960s ballads